Sergei Babin is a former Russian police officer who had served in the OMON (special police) detachment sent  from Saint Petersburg and is an accused war criminal.

In early 2005 Babin was charged with the robbery and murder of an old man during the notorious Novye Aldi massacre near Grozny, Chechnya in February 2000. After this, Babin went into hiding and was put on the wanted list; later in 2005, the preliminary criminal case investigation was suspended on grounds of having to search for the accused.

Babin himself maintains he was part of an engineering squad sent to dismantle explosives and had served seven tours of duty in Chechnya without killing anyone. Many in the Russian anti-war movement believe he was chosen by the government as a scapegoat and there was a mass protest in support of Babin by the anti-government opposition in 2005.

See also
Sergey Lapin (police officer)

References

External links
ECHR on Russian war crimes: responses from Moscow and Grozny, Prague Watchdog, July 27, 2007

Year of birth missing (living people)
Fugitives wanted by Russia
Fugitives wanted on war crimes charges
People of the Chechen wars
Russian police officers
Living people
Police misconduct